Igaratá is a municipality in the state of São Paulo in Brazil. It is part of the Metropolitan Region of Vale do Paraíba e Litoral Norte. The population is 9,583 (2020 est.) in an area of 292.95 km². The elevation is 745 m. This place name comes from the Tupi language.

Geography
Igaratá lies adjacent to the Igaratá reservoir, fed and drained by the Jaguari River. Aquatic sports and fishery are common practice among the locals and tourists.

The municipality contains part of the  Mananciais do Rio Paraíba do Sul Environmental Protection Area, created in 1982 to protect the sources of the Paraíba do Sul river.

Economy
Igaratá's economy is mainly based on agriculture, because of the fertile lands bordering the Jaguari Dam. Tourism is very important to the local economy, supporting handicraft work from the local people. Cattle are also very important, thanks to the grasslands of the São Paulo Highlands.

References

Municipalities in São Paulo (state)